Aaron Wagner (born July 5, 1982) is a former Canadian football fullback/linebacker for the Saskatchewan Roughriders of the Canadian Football League. He was drafted in the second round of the 2005 CFL Draft by the Toronto Argonauts. He played college football at BYU and  WSU.

Professional career

Pre-draft measurables

Saskatchewan Roughriders
After being drafted by the Toronto Argonauts in the 2005 CFL Draft, he opted to return to BYU. He joined Toronto in 2006 after a brief stint with The New York Jets of the National Football League ( NFL ). In Toronto, Wagner started at linebacker for the Argonauts, but mostly played on special teams. It was reported by The Canadian Press on February 15, 2009, that Wagner had been traded to the Saskatchewan Roughriders for future considerations.

After retiring from Pro Football, Aaron has gone on to have a prolific business career and has found massive success in founding and managing multiple companies. His success has led him to amass over $200 Million dollars in Net Worth from various companies and investments.

References

External links 
Saskatchewan Roughriders bio
Toronto Argonauts bio
Roughriders Aaron Wagner knows different side

1982 births
Living people
Canadian football linebackers
American football linebackers
Players of Canadian football from British Columbia
BYU Cougars football players
Toronto Argonauts players
Saskatchewan Roughriders players
Sportspeople from Cranbrook, British Columbia